Ramniranjan Jhunjhunwala College (Autonomous) is college located in Ghatkopar (W), Mumbai, India.  It is affiliated to University of Mumbai It was established in 1963.

Reward
It has been awarded and rated "A" grade by the NAAC with CGPA 3.50 and has been awarded "Best College" of Mumbai University in 2009 and ISO 9001:2008 Associated in 2010 rather than that it has been Awarded ISO 14001:2004 in 2013 and has achieved Jagar Janivancha Award by Maharashtra Government 2013–14.

The college has been granted "Autonomous Status" by University Grants Commission (UGC) for a period of ten years w.e.f. 2018–2019 to 2027-2028 (Letter No. F. 22-1/2018(AC) dated 28 May 2018). However, the college remains affiliated to University of Mumbai with an autonomous status.

References
 Mumbai University Academic Audit Report.
 Maharashtra CM at RJ College on Education.
 Chief Guest for convocation Ceremony
 Cyber Security and InfoSec by OWASP Student Chapter at Mumbai.
 School website

Universities and colleges in Mumbai
University of Mumbai